Indianapolis has seven designated neighborhoods as Cultural Districts, first established in 1999: Broad Ripple Village; Mass Ave; Fountain Square; Wholesale District; Canal and White River State Park; Indiana Avenue; and Market East. The purpose of these designations was to capitalize on cultural institutions within historically significant neighborhoods unique to the city's heritage for economic development and revitalization.

Broad Ripple Village

Originally established as independent municipality on a meander of the White River, Broad Ripple was annexed by the City of Indianapolis in 1922. Present-day Broad Ripple retains much of its pre-annexation character.

It currently hosts an active social scene, fueled by the student population of nearby Butler University. A large number of private art galleries, bars, and independently owned restaurants line the district's streets. There are various venues for eating, drinking, entertainment, and shopping. Located on the Monon Trail, Broad Ripple is also popular with recreational trail users, including bicyclists and runners.

Points of interest in the district include:
Central Canal
Indianapolis Art Center
Monon Trail

Mass Ave

Massachusetts Avenue, or more commonly referred to as Mass Ave, offers some of the city's most visible theaters and art galleries. Located just a few blocks northeast of Monument Circle, Massachusetts Avenue was designed in 1821 as one of Downtown's four original diagonal streets and began as a commercial artery that mainly served the surrounding residential area. Mass Ave gained popularity as service-oriented businesses sprung up with the development of streetcar lines, with continued growth between 1870 and 1930.

Bernard Vonnegut, grandfather of author Kurt Vonnegut, and Arthur Bohn designed Athenæum (Das Deutsche Haus) in 1893 as a home for German societies in Indianapolis to gather. Both were American-born sons of German immigrants, a culture that had a strong influence in the area around this time. Following these many years of good fortune and commercial growth, this area and all of Downtown fell into economic decline following World War II once Indianapolis lost its importance as a railroad hub.

Gentrification in the 1990s propelled the area from squalor to one of the city's more fashionable addresses. Currently, redevelopment of Mass Ave focuses on fostering locally owned shops, theaters, and restaurants. The once destined-for-demolition Athenaeum building now houses the American Cabaret Theatre, Rathskeller Restaurant and downtown YMCA location.

Points of interest in the district include:
Athenæum (Das Deutsche Haus)
Old National Centre
St. Mary's Catholic Church

Fountain Square

A center of commerce for more than 100 years, the historic community is undergoing a period of rebirth and restoration, and is an emerging arts center for Indianapolis.

In the nineteenth century, the area was a huge working apple orchard. As the city population swelled, the apple trees were cut down and houses were built. The neighborhood was economically strong for many decades, but had suffered from a high unemployment rate and increasing crime and drug problems. In the 1970s, Interstate 65 was constructed through Indianapolis, severing Fountain Square from Downtown's neighborhoods, resulting in a period of decline. Currently, there are a number of neighborhood development corporations and community groups working to revitalize the area with increasing success.

Points of interest in the district include:
Murphy Arts Building
Wheeler Arts Community

Wholesale District

Around the turn of the century Downtown Indianapolis had one of the largest networks of railroads in the nation and hundreds of trains passed through Union Station daily. Streets adjacent to the station were lined with businesses, hotels, warehouses, retail shops and more. Wholesale grocers sold fresh goods daily before the advent of the modern grocery store. The district had many such grocers, but also wholesalers who sold dry and finished goods. The House of Crane, whose facade remains part of Circle Centre, sold cigars; Hanson, VanCamp & Co. sold hardware. In addition, South Delaware Street became known as Commission Row, where farmers brought their produce to merchants who sold the goods for a commission fee. The Wholesale District was of primary importance in the transformation of Indianapolis from small town to big city. No longer did shoppers have to rely on retailers who sold finished goods shipped from Louisville or Cincinnati. They could now go to a central location and buy the same items at wholesale prices. With Union Station nearby, wholesalers could ship goods more cheaply and more easily. Unfortunately, the Great Depression devastated the area and few businesses remained.

Points of interest in the district include:
Circle Centre Mall
Hilbert Circle Theatre (Indianapolis Symphony Orchestra)
Indiana Theatre
Indianapolis Artsgarden
Indianapolis Union Station
Slippery Noodle Inn
St. Elmo Steak House
St. John the Evangelist Catholic Church
Soldiers' and Sailors' Monument

Canal and White River State Park

The long defunct Indiana Central Canal in Downtown Indianapolis was refurbished and reopened as a city recreational area in the early 1990s. This new incarnation was inspired by Venetian canals. Cultural attractions, residential, and commercial developments were built along both sides of the Canal. The north end of the Canal is now home to a burgeoning life science campus connected with the Indiana University School of Medicine. An extension of the Canal into the heart of the White River State Park was completed in 1996. The extension was part of a $20 million infrastructure improvement project that included renovation of the Old Washington Street Bridge, built in 1916 as part of the National Road, into a pedestrian crossing that links park attractions.

Points of interest in the district include:
Bethel A.M.E. Church
Eiteljorg Museum of American Indians and Western Art
Indiana Government Center North
Indiana Historical Society
Indiana State Library and Historical Bureau
Indiana State Museum
Indianapolis Zoo
Medal of Honor Memorial
NCAA Hall of Champions
NCAA National Office
Indiana 9/11 Memorial
USS Indianapolis National Memorial
Victory Field
White River Gardens

Indiana Avenue

In 1870, more African Americans were calling Indiana Avenue home as the original Irish and German populations began to move outward. The population had risen to 974 residents, more than one-third of the city's total African American population. The first African American businesses appeared on the 500 block of Indiana Avenue as early as 1865: Samuel G. Smother's grocery store; William Franklin's peddler shop; and the city's first African American-owned newspaper, The Indianapolis Leader in 1879.

The Great Migration resulted in the settlement of a sizable African American community along the Avenue. In 1927, the Madam C. J. Walker Building opened. The building and the theater within is named for Madam C. J. Walker, an African American entrepreneur, philanthropist, and activist who began her beauty empire in Indianapolis. Indiana Avenue was home to a notable jazz scene from the 1920s through the 1960s, producing greats such as David Baker, Slide Hampton, Freddie Hubbard, J. J. Johnson, James Spaulding, and the Montgomery Brothers (Buddy, Monk, and Wes). Wes Montgomery is considered one of the most influential jazz guitarists of all time, and is credited with popularizing the "Naptown Sound."

However, by the late-1950s, the African-American middle class had begun to leave Indiana Avenue. The Walker Manufacturing Company remained in operation in the Walker Building in 1965, but the majority of the building was shut down, removing a vital economic anchor for the area. By the early-1970s, Indiana Avenue was suffering from severe urban blight, with much of the area's building stock cleared for the development of the Indiana University–Purdue University Indianapolis (IUPUI) campus. Today, while no longer a blighted area, Indiana Avenue's legacy consists of few historic buildings and a plaque.

Points of interest in the district include:
Lockefield Gardens
Madam Walker Legacy Center

Market East

Market East is the most-recently designated cultural district in Indianapolis, having received that designation in April 2014. The district is on the east side of downtown and is bounded by Delaware Street on the west, New York Street on the north, East Street on the east, and the Indianapolis Union Railway on the south.

Points of interest in the district include:
City-County Building
Indianapolis City Market
Julia M. Carson Transit Center
Old Indianapolis City Hall

References

External links
Downtown Indy Cultural Districts
Visit Indy Indianapolis Cultural Districts

Neighborhoods in Indianapolis
Culture of Indianapolis